"I Wish" is a song by English singer-songwriter Gabrielle. It was written by Gabrielle and Jon Douglas for her debut album, Find Your Way (1993), while production was helmed by Douglas. Released as the album's third single on 29 November 1993, the song peaked at number 26 on the UK Singles Chart. In North America, "I Wish" reached number 52 in the United States and number 76 in Canada.

Critical reception
Larry Flick from Billboard magazine wrote, "Top 40 follow-up to the breakthrough hit "Dreams" shows Gabrielle in fine, feline voice, delivering sweetly romantic lyrics atop a plush shuffle beat. Coated with delicious strings and a light soul subtext, single has the strength to easily surpass its predecessor's chart peak and firmly establish Gabrielle as a radio star with a long and bright future." Alan Jones from Music Week gave it four out of five. He added, "There's a surfeit of superior soul balladeering this week, and Gabrielle's is one of the best. it is likely to be huge." James Hamilton from the RM Dance Update described it as a "pleasant nasally crooned rolling swayer". German band Culture Beat reviewed the song for Smash Hits, giving it three out of five.

Track listings

Charts

References

1993 singles
1993 songs
Gabrielle (singer) songs
Go! Beat singles
Songs written by Gabrielle (singer)